FDO may refer to:

Organizations
 Federación Deportiva Obrera, the Workers Sport Federation, a defunct Argentine sporting organization
 freedesktop.org, a free software project
 Family Dollar, an American variety store chain
 FAIR Digital Object, a data management framework

Other uses
 Feedback-directed optimization, a compiler optimization
 Flight Dynamics Officer

See also
 San Fernando Airport (Argentina) (IATA: -, ICAO: SADF), serving San Fernando, Argentina